The 2021 Tour de Romandie was a road cycling stage race, that took place between 27 April and 2 May 2021 in Romandy, the French-speaking part of western Switzerland. It was the 74th edition of the Tour de Romandie and the 17th race of the 2021 UCI World Tour.

Teams 
All nineteen UCI WorldTeams and the Swiss national team participated in the race. Each of the 20 teams entered seven riders, for a total of 140 riders, of which 120 finished.

UCI WorldTeams

 
 
 
 
 
 
 
 
 
 
 
 
 
 
 
 
 
 
 

National Teams

 Switzerland

Route

Stages

Prologue 
27 April 2021 — Oron,  (ITT)

Stage 1 
28 April 2021 — Aigle to Martigny,

Stage 2 
29 April 2021 — La Neuveville to Saint-Imier,

Stage 3 
30 April 2021 — Estavayer to Estavayer,

Stage 4 
1 May 2021 — Sion to Thyon 2000,

Stage 5 
2 May 2021 — Fribourg to Fribourg,  (ITT)

Classification leadership table 

 On stage 1, Geraint Thomas, who was second in the points classification, wore the green jersey, because first-placed Rohan Dennis wore the yellow jersey as the leader of the general classification.

Final classification standings

General classification

Points classification

Mountains classification

Young rider classification

Team classification

References

External links 
 

2021
2021 UCI World Tour
2021 in Swiss sport
April 2021 sports events in Switzerland
May 2021 sports events in Switzerland